The Georgia-Imeretia Governorate was a short-lived governorate (guberniya) of the Caucasus Viceroyalty of the Russian Empire, administered from Tiflis (Tbilisi).  Roughly corresponding to modern Georgia and parts of Armenia and Azerbaijan, it was created in 1840 from the territory of the Georgia Governorate and the oblasts of Imeretia and Armenia.

In 1846 the Imperial administration of the Caucasus was reorganized and the Georgia-Imeretia Governorate was abolished, with its territory forming the new governorates of Tiflis and Kutais.

Administrative divisions 

At its creation the Georgia-Imeretia Governorate contained eight uyezds: 
Akhaltsikhe
Belokan (from 1844 a separate Djaro-Belokan Okrug)
Guria
Gori
Elisabethpol
Kutaisi
Telavi
Erivan

Caucasus Viceroyalty (1801–1917)
Governorates of the Caucasus
1840s in Georgia (country)
States and territories established in 1840
States and territories disestablished in 1846
1840 establishments in the Russian Empire
1846 disestablishments in the Russian Empire